The London International Stamp Exhibition was held from 14-26 May 1923 at the Royal Horticultural Hall, London. It was organised by the Junior Philatelic Society (now the National Philatelic Society).

One of the key exhibits was the collection of Victoria Half-lengths formed by Charles Lathrop Pack along with his Diligencias. The roof of the hall was shaded in order to protect the numerous exhibits from the Sun and whitewash was used.

References

Further reading
International Stamp Exhibition, Royal Horticultural Hall, London, May 14-26, 1923. Junior Philatelic Society, London, 1923.

1923 in London
1923
May 1923 events